The Screech Owls is a series of juvenile fiction novels by Canadian author Roy MacGregor. There are currently 27 titles in the series, all published by McClelland & Stewart.

Summary 

The series centers around a fictional hockey team, however it incorporates actual events and locations, such as the Quebec Peewee Invitational in Quebec, Canada. and the 1998 Winter Olympics and 2002 Winter Olympics in Nagano, Japan and Salt Lake City, United States, respectively.

There does not appear to be a clear time line of events in the series. Although MacGregor often refers back to events that occurred in previous books in the series, the static ages of the players and the seemingly never-ending hockey season contradict any definite time line.

The books themselves, all of which are told from the point of view of team captain, Travis Lindsay, provide light action and mystery for the young reader. Terrorists, murderers, kidnappers, ghosts and other improbable anomalies befall the preteen in between, and sometimes during, their hockey games and tournaments.

Awards and recognition
The Screech Owls Series has won the Our Choice Award and the Manitoba Young Reader’s Choice Award. The series has also been shortlisted for several awards, including the Arthur Ellis Award.

Television show
Screech Owls aired on YTV from September 1, 2000 to February 1, 2002. It was nominated for Best Children's or Youth Series or Program at the 16th Gemini Awards in 2001.  Jonathan Malen was nominated at the Young Artist's Awards. In the USA, it aired alongside other YTV imports (including Mystery Hunters and Strange Days at Blake Holsey High) on Discovery Kids.

Titles
 Mystery at Lake Placid                                           
 The Night They Stole the Stanley Cup                             
 The Screech Owls' Northern Adventure                             
 Murder at Hockey Camp                         
 Kidnapped in Sweden                                          
 Terror in Florida                                                
 The Quebec City Crisis                                           
 The Screech Owls' Home Loss                                      
 Nightmare in Nagano                                              
 Danger in Dinosaur Valley                                        
 The Ghost of the Stanley Cup
 The West Coast Murders
 Sudden Death in New York City
 Horror on River Road
 Death Down Under
 Power Play in Washington
 Secret of The Deep Woods
 Murder at the Winter Games
 Attack on the Tower of London
 The Screech Owls' Reunion
 Peril at the World's Biggest Hockey Tournament
 Trouble at the Top of the World
 Face-Off at the Alamo
 Panic in Pittsburgh
 The Mystery of the Russian Ransom
 The Boston Breakout
 Reality Check in Detroit

References

External links

Series of books
Novels set in Ontario
Novels about ice hockey
Junior ice hockey in Canada
McClelland & Stewart books